Henry McMillian (born October 17, 1971) is a former American football defensive tackle in the National Football League for the Seattle Seahawks.  He played college football at Florida and was drafted in the sixth round of the 1995 NFL Draft.

References

Living people
1971 births
Seattle Seahawks players
Florida Gators football players